In Catalan legend and popular culture, the Pesanta is an enormous dog (or sometimes a cat) that goes into people's houses in the night and puts itself on their chests, making it difficult for them to breathe and causing them the most horrible nightmares.  The Pesanta is black and hairy, with steel paws, but with holes, so it can't take anything.

See also
 Sleep paralysis
 Against a Dwarf
 Batibat
 Lietuvēns
 Mare (folklore)

Catalan mythology
Catalan legendary creatures
Mythological dogs
Catalan words and phrases
Sleep in mythology and folklore